Enric Serra i Auqué (7 January 1858, Barcelona - 16 February 1918, Rome) was a Catalan painter; best known for his landscapes in the Neoclassical style.

Biography 
His father,  Pere Serra i Flaqué, a shoemaker, was a native of L'Escala.

He arrived in time to become one of the last followers of Marià Fortuny, and was a member of the Accademia Chigi. 

After completing his studies, in 1878, he remained in Rome. Many of the paintings he produced there featured lakes. He was also influenced by the works of Ramón Tusquets.

Later, when he had established himself, his workshop became a popular place for young painters to visit. As a hobby, he collected furniture and various antiques, many of which he used for backdrops in his paintings. He regularly sent his works back to Barcelona for exhibit at the Sala Parés. In 1895, he relocated to Paris. That same year, he was awarded a third-class medal at the National Exhibition of Fine Arts. 

Later, he received a commission from Pope Leo XIII to design a mosaic of the Virgin and Child for installation at the monastery of Santa Maria de Ripoll. 

His works may be seen at the Museu Nacional d'Art de Catalunya and at the Biblioteca Museu Víctor Balaguer in Vilanova i la Geltrú.

Selected paintings

References 

 Manuel Ossorio y Bernard, Galería biográfica de artistas españoles del siglo XIX, Imprenta de Moreno y Rojas, pgs. 638-639
 Cristina Mendoza, Ramon Casas, Retrats al carbó, Editorial AUSA, 1995

External links

More works by Serra @ ArtNet

1858 births
1918 deaths
Spanish painters
Painters from Catalonia
Spanish genre painters
Spanish landscape painters
Spanish emigrants to Italy
Painters from Barcelona